I'll Be Seeing You is an album by vocalist Etta Jones which was recorded in 1976 and released on the Muse label.

Reception

The AllMusic review by Scott Yanow stated "A straightforward and jazz-influenced singer, Etta Jones' series of recordings for the Muse label were among the finest of her career. On this date, as usual, she is joined by her husband, the great soul-jazz tenor saxophonist Houston Person, along with a rhythm section".

Track listing
 "Laughing at Life" (Nick A. Kenny, Bob Todd) – 3:53
 "I Realize Now" (Stanley Cowen, Taps Miller) – 4:30
 "I Think I'll Tell Him" (Thom Bell, Linda Creed) – 4:50
 "Jim" (James Petrillo, Milton Samuels, Nelson Shawn) – 5:03
 "Crazy He Calls Me" (Carl Sigman, Bob Russell) – 4:53
 "Why Was I Born?" (Jerome Kern, Oscar Hammerstein II) – 3:22	
 "Etta's Blues" (Etta Jones) – 4:55
 "I'll Be Seeing You" (Sammy Fain, Irving Kahal) – 4:31

Personnel
Etta Jones – vocals
Houston Person – tenor saxophone
George Devens – vibraphone
Stan Hope  – piano
Milt Hinton – bass
Vernel Fournier – drums
Ralph Dorsey – percussion

References

Muse Records albums
Etta Jones albums
Albums recorded at Van Gelder Studio
1988 albums